Korneliya is a feminine given name, similar to Kornelia.

List of people with the given name 

 Korneliya Naydenova (born 1982), Bulgarian footballer
 Korneliya Ninova (born 1969), Bulgarian politician

Feminine given names
Bulgarian feminine given names